Tillandsia heterandra, synonym Vriesea heterandra, is a species of flowering plant in the family Bromeliaceae, native to north-west South America (Bolivia, Colombia, Ecuador and Venezuela). It was first described by Édouard André in 1888.

References

heterandra
Flora of Bolivia
Flora of Colombia
Flora of Ecuador
Flora of Venezuela
Plants described in 1888